Naval Battle in the Gulf of Naples is an oil painting on panel by the Flemish Renaissance artist Pieter Bruegel the Elder, painted from 1558 to 1562. It is in the Doria Pamphilj Gallery in Rome.

Painting
Bruegel traveled to the Italian peninsula with Abraham Ortelius in 1551 and 1553. They stopped in Rome, Naples, and Messina. Many drawings were produced, including one depicting a naval confrontation in the Straits of Messina, which was turned into an engraving by Frans Huys. The veduta takes historical and topographical licenses: no such battle occurred in precisely this setting, nor does the harbor resemble Bruegel's depiction. The exact date of the composition is disputed; scholars do agree, however, that the volcano and its positioning seem to reflect Bruegel's neoplatonic pantheism.

References

Paintings by Pieter Bruegel the Elder
Collections of the Doria Pamphilj Gallery